Christos Kourfalidis (born 11 November 2002) is a Greek professional footballer who plays as a midfielder for  club Cagliari.

Club career
Kourfalidis joined the youth system of Cagliari for the 2018–19 season. For the 2019–20 season, he was loaned to Foggia in Serie D. On 13 July 2021, he signed his first professional contract with Cagliari until 30 June 2023.

He made his debut for the senior squad of Cagliari on 15 December 2021 in a Coppa Italia game against Cittadella. He made his Serie A debut for Cagliari on 23 January 2022 in a game against Fiorentina, a 1–1 home draw.

References

External links
 

2002 births
Footballers from Thessaloniki
Living people
Greek footballers
Association football midfielders
Cagliari Calcio players
Calcio Foggia 1920 players
Serie A players
Serie B players
Serie D players
Greek expatriate footballers
Expatriate footballers in Italy
Greek expatriate sportspeople in Italy